For the author of "Amal al-Mutlaq", see Mohammed al-Qasim al-Sijilmasi.

Abu Ishak Ibrahim ibn Hilal al-Sijilmasi (died circa 1497-1498) was a Moroccan legal scholar well known for his verdicts (fatwas). He is the author of al-Durr al-nathīr alá Ajwibat Abī al-Hasan al-Saghīr, Hādhihi ajwibat al-Imām ibn Hilāl  and a commentary on Misbah al-arwah fi usul al falah.

References

Moroccan writers
Moroccan Maliki scholars
1497 deaths
1498 deaths
People from Sijilmasa
15th-century Moroccan people
Year of birth unknown
15th-century jurists